Infatuation is a 1918 French silent film directed by René Hervil and Louis Mercanton. It starred dancer Gaby Deslys. The film had releases in Portugal and Hungary as well as the United States. Its original title in French was Bouclette.

Cast
Gaby Deslys as Flora Hys
Harry Pilcer as Gray Stanton
Gabriel Signoret as Henri Le Baron
Marcel L'Herbier as Paul Bernard
Max Maxudian as Brulard (*uncredited)

References

External links
Infatuation at IMDb.com

1918 films
Lost French films
French black-and-white films
French silent feature films
Films directed by René Hervil
Films directed by Louis Mercanton
Pathé Exchange films
French drama films
1918 drama films
1918 lost films
Lost drama films
1910s French-language films
1910s lost films
1910s American films
1910s French films